The Hooper Solar PV Power Plant is a 50 megawatt (MWAC) photovoltaic power station in the San Luis Valley, located near the town of Mosca, Colorado.   It was the largest solar facility in the state when it came online at the end of 2015.   The electricity is being sold to Public Service of Colorado, a subsidiary of Xcel Energy, under a long-term power purchase agreement.

Facility details

The facility occupies about 320 acres of previous agricultural farmland, and is located near several other large solar power plants in the sunny and cool San Luis Valley.  It was developed and constructed by SunPower, and is owned by a subsidiary of the French company Total S.A. which is also the majority owner of SunPower.    The plant is built using SunPower's Oasis Power Plant System, which includes single-axis tracking, robotic panel cleaning, and real-time monitoring at the company's operations center.

Construction began in early 2015, and employed about 150 workers. Mortenson Construction completed the site preparation and installed the array support piles and other civil structures.  Commercial operations began in December 2015 shortly after the delivery of first electricity to the grid.

The facility is sited adjacent to a San Luis Valley substation and has been planned to accommodate a future 100 MW expansion.

Electricity production

See also

 San Luis Valley Solar Ranch
 Solar power in Colorado
 Solar power in the United States
 Renewable energy in the United States
 Renewable portfolio standard

External links 
 VIDEO: SunPower Robotic Panel Cleaning

References

Buildings and structures in Alamosa County, Colorado
Photovoltaic power stations in Colorado
Photovoltaic power stations in the United States
Energy infrastructure completed in 2015